Olaf Meyland-Smith (23 July 1882 – 26 November 1924) was a Danish road racing cyclist who competed in the 1912 Summer Olympics. He was born in Fraugde, Odense County and died in Sundby, Copenhagen.

In 1912 he was a member of the Danish cycling team which finished eighth in the team time trial event. In the individual time trial competition he finished 25th.

References

1882 births
1924 deaths
Danish male cyclists
Olympic cyclists of Denmark
Cyclists at the 1912 Summer Olympics
People from Odense Municipality
Sportspeople from the Region of Southern Denmark